The New York/New Jersey Comets were a women's professional softball team. In February 2013, National Pro Fastpitch announced the Comets as an expansion team, replacing the Carolina Diamonds which had folded at the end of the 2012 season. The team played home games at several sites in 2013: Provident Bank Park in Ramapo, New York, Yogi Berra Stadium in Montclair, New Jersey, TD Bank Ballpark in Bridgewater, New Jersey, and Coca-Cola Park in Allentown, Pennsylvania.

The Comets were named in honor of the women who played in the All-American Girls Professional Baseball League and specifically after the Kenosha Comets, one of the founding members of the AAGPBL.

Roster
The Comets assumed the rights to players that were previously held by Carolina.

References

External links

Sports clubs established in 2013
Sports clubs disestablished in 2013
Defunct softball teams in the United States
Defunct National Pro Fastpitch teams
2013 establishments in New Jersey
2013 establishments in New York (state)
2013 disestablishments in New York (state)
2013 disestablishments in New Jersey
Defunct sports teams in New Jersey
Defunct sports teams in New York (state)
Women's sports in New York (state)